Basirhat Lok Sabha constituency is one of the 543 parliamentary constituencies in India. The constituency centres on Basirhat in West Bengal. All the seven assembly segments of No. 18 Basirhat Lok Sabha constituency are in North 24 Parganas district.

Overview

According to the Hindustan Times, Basirhat and Bangaon have the most porous stretch of West Bengal's 2,217 km border with Bangladesh.The Indian Express estimates the proportion of Muslims in Basirhat's electorate at 54%.

Assembly segments
As per order of the Delimitation Commission in respect of the delimitation of constituencies in the West Bengal, parliamentary constituency no. 18 Basirhat is composed of the following assembly segments from 2009:

Members of Parliament

Election results

General election 2019

General election 2014

General election 2009

|-
! style="background-color:#E9E9E9;text-align:left;" width=225 |Party
! style="background-color:#E9E9E9;text-align:right;" |Seats won
! style="background-color:#E9E9E9;text-align:right;" |Seat change
! style="background-color:#E9E9E9;text-align:right;" |Vote percentage
|-
| style="text-align:left;" |Trinamool Congress
| style="text-align:center;" | 19
| style="text-align:center;" | 18
| style="text-align:center;" | 31.8
|-
| style="text-align:left;" |Indian National Congress
| style="text-align:center;" | 6
| style="text-align:center;" | 0
| style="text-align:center;" | 13.45
|-
| style="text-align:left;" |Socialist Unity Centre of India (Communist) 
| style="text-align:center;" | 1
| style="text-align:center;" | 1
| style="text-align:center;" | NA
|-
|-
| style="text-align:left;" |Communist Party of India (Marxist)
| style="text-align:center;" | 9
| style="text-align:center;" | 17
| style="text-align:center;" | 33.1
|-
| style="text-align:left;" |Communist Party of India
| style="text-align:center;" | 2
| style="text-align:center;" | 1
| style="text-align:center;" | 3.6
|-
| style="text-align:left;" |Revolutionary Socialist Party
| style="text-align:center;" | 2
| style="text-align:center;" | 1
| style="text-align:center;" | 3.56
|-
| style="text-align:left;" |Forward bloc
| style="text-align:center;" | 2
| style="text-align:center;" | 1
| style="text-align:center;" | 3.04
|-
| style="text-align:left;" |Bharatiya Janata Party
| style="text-align:center;" | 1
| style="text-align:center;" | 1
| style="text-align:center;" | 6.14
|-
|}

General elections 1951-2004
Basirhat was double-member constituency in 1951 and 1957. Thereafter, it was a single seat constituency. Most of the contests were multi-cornered. However, only winners and runners-up are mentioned below:

See also
 Basirhat
 List of Constituencies of the Lok Sabha

References

External links
Basirhat lok sabha  constituency election 2019 result details

Lok Sabha constituencies in West Bengal
Politics of North 24 Parganas district